Enazakura Tooru (born 29 July 1960 as Toru Hayakawa) is a former sumo wrestler from Sakashita, Gifu, Japan. He made his professional debut in March 1977 and reached the top division in November 1987. His highest rank was maegashira 1. Upon retirement from active competition in 1994 he became an elder in the Japan Sumo Association, leaving in July 1999.

Career
He was recruited by the former ozeki Daikirin and joined Oshiogawa stable in March 1977 at the age of 16. He began fighting under his own surname of Hayakawa, receiving the shikona of Enazakura (meaning ″the cherry blossoms of Ena″, a region in his native Gifu Prefecture) in 1980. He was not particularly large, at around 180 cm and 120 kg, so it took him nine years of toil in the lower divisions before he became an elite sekitori ranked wrestler in March 1986. He won promotion to the top makuuchi division in November 1987, alongside Kotoinazuma and Nankairyu, and all three came thorough with kachi-koshi or winning records. In July 1989 he earned what was to be his only sansho or special prize, for Fighting Spirit after a fine 10–5 score. He never reached the sanyaku ranks, peaking at maegashira 1 which he reached in November 1990 at the age of 30. He was unable to defeat a yokozuna in his career, but won both of his two matches against ōzeki Konishiki.

Enazakura enjoyed cooking and listening to traditional Japanese music, and was an enka singer himself.

Retirement
Enazakura′s last appearance in the top division was in March 1993, and he was demoted from the second juryo division a year later. He retired in July 1994 after two losing scores in the unsalaried makushita division. He remained in a sumo as a coach at Oshiogwawa stable, under the elder name Shikoroyama which was owned by the former komusubi Wakabayama. He switched to the Takenawa elder name in 1995, but when this was needed by the retiring Tochinowaka in July 1999, Enazakura had to leave the sumo world. He received a 2 million yen retirement payoff. Afterwards he ran a sumo-themed chanko restaurant.

Fighting style
Enazakura was a solid if unspectacular wrestler who favoured pushing and thrusting techniques to fighting on the mawashi or belt. He regularly used oshi dashi (push out), tsuki otoshi (thrust over), hataki komi (slap down), hiki otoshi (pull down) and yori kiri (force out). He rarely employed throwing moves, occasionally using sukuinage (scoop throw).

Career record

See also
Glossary of sumo terms
List of past sumo wrestlers
List of sumo tournament second division champions

References

1960 births
Living people
Japanese sumo wrestlers
Sumo people from Gifu Prefecture